Olympen was a music venue located in Lund, Sweden. It had a capacity of 2,500 and hosted many famous artists from 1971 to 2009. A list of partial performers include Alice Cooper, Steppenwolf, Queen, Faces, Paul McCartney and Wings, Kiss, ABBA, Neil Young, Black Sabbath, Bob Dylan, Depeche Mode, Frank Zappa, Santana and Metallica. The facility was remodeled into a gym in 2011.

References

Concert halls in Sweden
Music venues in Sweden